Patita is a 1980 Indian Hindi-language film directed by I. V. Sasi. It stars Shoma Anand in the title role, with Mithun Chakraborty, Raj Kiran, Vikram in pivotal roles. The film was a remake of director's own Malayalam film Avalude Ravukal.

Plot

Cast 
Mithun Chakraborty as Jain
Raj Kiran as Ashok
Vikram as Deepkamal
Shoma Anand as Rajni
Madan Puri as Jain's Father
Sujit Kumar as Inspector Dilip
Raj Mehra as Ashok's Father
Sulochana Latkar as Ashok's Mother
Ramesh Deo as Rajni's Father
Seema Deo as Rajni's Mother
Shammi as Maria
Ram Sethi as Moti
Mac Mohan

Soundtrack

References

External links 
 

1980 films
1980s Hindi-language films
Films directed by I. V. Sasi
Films scored by Bappi Lahiri
Hindi remakes of Malayalam films